Coleophora inversella is a moth of the family Coleophoridae. It is found in Libya.

References

inversella
Endemic fauna of Libya
Moths described in 1934
Moths of Africa